Arikady  is a village in Kasaragod district in the state of Kerala, India.

Demographics
As of 2011 India census, Arikady village had population of 6,941 with 3,325 males (47.9%) and 3,616 females (52.1%). Population of children in the age group of 0-6 was 1,019 (14.7%) among which 538 are boys and 481 are girls. 
Arikady village had overall literacy rate of 89.3% which constitutes male literacy of 94.3% and female literacy of 84.9%.

References

Suburbs of Kasaragod